Dimitri Demonière (born 28 March 1979) is a French sprinter who specializes in the 100 metres.

At the 1998 World Junior Championships he finished fourth in the 100 metres and sixth in the 4 x 100 metres relay. He also finished seventh in relay at the 2006 World Cup. He competed individually at the 2006 European Championships without reaching the final round.

His personal best time is 10.27 seconds, achieved in July 2006 in Tomblaine.

Since October 2016, he is the trainer of Jimmy Vicaut at the INSEP.

References

1979 births
Living people
French male sprinters
Martiniquais athletes
French people of Martiniquais descent